The 1951 Texas A&M Aggies football team represented Texas A&M University in the 1951 college football season as a member of the Southwest Conference (SWC). The Aggies were led by head coach Raymond George in his first season and finished with a record of five wins, three losses and two ties (5–3–2 overall, 1–3–2 in the SWC).

Schedule

Roster
Yale Lary
Charles McDonald

References

Texas AandM
Texas A&M Aggies football seasons
Texas AandM Aggies football